Michael John Foster (born 12 January 1952) is an English priest, youth leader and an historian of scouting and other youth organisations. He was Grand Scoutmaster of the Order of World Scouts and Grand Scoutmaster and formerly the Chief Commissioner of the British Boy Scouts and British Girl Scouts. He is an ordained Anglican priest and, until 2020 when he retired, was a parish priest.

Early Scout career
He became a Wolf Cub in 1960, with a scout group registered with The Boy Scouts Association and was then a Boy Scout registered with the same association in 1967 but left in 1971 owing to the sweeping changes of the Advance Party Report introduced within the Scout Association.

Scout Career in the Order of World Scouts
In 1977, whilst at Oxford reading theology at St Stephen's House, Oxford, he re-founded the "St Stephen's House Rover Crew" as an independent venture, with the blessing of the then principal, Dr David Hope). In 1979, he discovered that the British Boy Scouts (BBS) still existed as a single Troop in Lewisham. A former principal of St Stephen's House had been the chaplain to the Lewisham Troop of the BBS. Travelling to Lewisham during the 1979 Easter recess, he sought out Charles Brown, the BBS Chief Commissioner and Grand Scoutmaster. The Rover Crew at St Stephen's House by then had been registered with the university authorities as the Oxford University Rover Crew and was admitted as an affiliated group to the BBS. He was made Commissioner for Oxfordshire. In 1983, when he was the Vicar of Holy Trinity, Nottingham and leader of its BBS troop, he was appointed as Chief Commissioner of the BBS by Charles Brown. In 2000, the then Grand Scoutmaster, Ted Scott, who had joined the BBS and OWS in 1926, asked him if he would become Grand Scoutmaster, allowing Scott to retire. In more than forty years of service to scouting, he was instrumental in the expansion of the BBS and OWS, inspiring the formation of scout organisations internationally and helping to re-establish understanding of scouting as a movement rather than an organisation. In 2017, he retired as Grand Scoutmaster and, in 2020, he resigned from the BBS.

In Succession to Sir Francis Vane
Michael Foster was the seventh Grandscoutmaster in succession to Sir Francis Vane.

Scout Historian & Academic
Dr Foster is acknowledged as a Scout historian. He was the first person to track down the origins of the name "Boy Scout" as beginning in the UK in the Aldine Press - first in the New Buffalow Bill Library, 1899, and then the True Blue War Library 1900–1906.
He has supplied the article "Boy Scouts" for the Encyclopedia of Children and Childhood, 2004.

Other contributions have been to the following books and Articles:

The Biography on Baden-Powell by the Author Tim Jeal.
The periodical 'Action Scout' ISO Press Westminster, 1988–1992. 
The Italian Book on Sir Francis Vane by Alberto dal Porto.
Sir Francis Vane, fifth baronet of Hutton by Roger T. Stearn - Article in the periodical 'Soldiers of the Queen'.
The other Scouts, by Tom Wood - Article in the periodical 'Practical Family History'
Paul Kua's Book on Scouting in Hong Kong 1910-2010
He has been involved in other areas of research; In 1978 he was a Philip Usher Memorial Scholar, and undertook research on "The Culturalization of the Greek Orthodox Church in Great Britain", and has undertaken a research degree in Psychology, and is a Fellow of the Royal Society of Medicine, and a Member of the Chartered Institute of Journalists.

References

Living people
1952 births